Kiera Chaplin (born 1 July 1982) is a model, entrepreneur and actress from Northern Ireland. She is the granddaughter of the English filmmaker Charlie Chaplin and the great-granddaughter of the American dramatist Eugene O'Neill.

Biography 
Chaplin was born in Belfast, the eldest daughter of Eugene Chaplin and his wife, Bernadette. She grew up in the same town as her father, in Corsier-sur-Vevey, Switzerland, until her parents' divorce in the mid-1990s.

In 2018 Kiera Chaplin created the Chaplin Awards in Asia. It is an award that goes to an actor or filmmaker whose work embodies Charlie Chaplin's qualities of realism, diversity and courage within their craft. So far recipients have been Tony Leung Chiu Wai and Zhang Yimou.

In 2018 Kiera Chaplin along with Jazmin Grimaldi were among the first participants to take part on The Rally Aicha des Gazelles in Morocco in an electric car to promote sustainability and prove this is the way of the future.

Kiera Chaplin also uses her popularity to campaign repeatedly for the rights of women and children. Since March 2019 she has been president of the Fondation Fleur du Désert in Paris, founded by human rights activist, model and bestselling author Waris Dirie. On 10 January 2020 Chaplin opened the first Kiera Chaplin Desert Flower School for 400 children in Sierra Leone (West Africa)..

Career 
Aged 16, Kiera Chaplin moved to Paris, where she was signed by the modelling agency NEXT Model Management. At the age of 17 she moved to New York, two years later to Los Angeles, and back to New York in 2006.

Kiera first gained attention through her modeling career in New York as a teenager, where she appeared in the pages of high fashion magazines such as Vogue, Vanity Fair and InStyle. She has graced the covers of Town and Country, Elle, Harper's Bazaar and has been in various ad campaigns such as United Colors of Benetton, Tommy Hilfiger, Asprey, Hogan by Karl Lagerfeld, Armani Exchange. She spent her teenage years working as a model and being photographed by the then most prestigious names in fashion photography, such as Mario Testino, Bruce Weber, Herb Ritts or Terry Richardson. In 2002 Kiera also has appeared in the Pirelli Calendar shot by photographer Peter Lindbergh.

Kiera Chaplin was awarded a "Lifestyle Icon" award by the Vienna Awards for Fashion and Lifestyle in 2010. But Kiera also became involved as a designer when she designed her own sneakers in 2013 in a collaboration with the Italian brand Hogan.

Chaplin had a 30% stake in the Hollywood-based film company Limelight Productions, named after her grandfather's last American film, and has appeared in supporting roles in films such as The Importance of Being Earnest (2002), the Bollywood productions Yatna (2005) and Chaurahen (2012), the biopic Sister Aimee: The Aimee Semple McPherson Story (2006), the Peter Fonda film Japan (2008) and the Italian comedic drama Interno Giorno by Tommaso Rossellini (2011) in which she had a prominent role in both French and English.
She was also a judge on Project Runway All Stars 2019 edition.

Kiera has been voted 17th-"most eligible woman in the world" by FHM magazine in the US as well as being voted the seventh sexiest woman in the world by GQ magazine.

In the summer of 2020, Kiera released her first single "Not Easy But Crazy" after a duet with Italian singer Simone Tomassini for his hit single "Charlot".

Ancestry

Award 
2010 Vienna Fashion Award, category Style Icon

References

External links 

 

1982 births
Living people
British film actresses
British people of American descent
British people of Irish descent
Kiera
Actresses from Belfast
21st-century actresses from Northern Ireland
Film actresses from Northern Ireland
Female models from Belfast
Lee Strasberg Theatre and Film Institute alumni